Who Disturbs The Water is an album written by Vic Anselmo. It was released in 2015.

Track listing
 "Another Train" 3:55
 "Flawless" 3:55
 "Say You" 3:53
 "Who Disturbs The Water" 3:15
 "Holy Ground"	3:51
 "Every Time You Come Around" 2:56
 "Cody" 3:57
 "My Every Breath" 4:18
 "Daylight" 3:59
 "Dream" 2:28

References

2015 albums
Vic Anselmo albums
Pop albums by Latvian artists
Folk albums by Latvian artists
World music albums